A caudate sonnet is an expanded version of the sonnet.  It consists of 14 lines in standard sonnet forms followed by a coda (Latin cauda meaning "tail", from which the name is derived).

The invention of the form is credited to Francesco Berni. However, Burchiello (1404–1449) used the same form with over 150 of his paradoxical (sometimes referred to as nonsensical) sonnets nearly 50 years before Berni was born. Burchiello's "popularity was not limited to Florence or the fifteenth century" and "in the sixteenth century Italian Renaissance" ... there were "several narratives about the poet-barber written by well-known figures such as Antonfrancesco Grazzini, Anton Francesco Doni, Angelo Colocci, and Tommaso Costo." Berni was not only familiar with Burchielo's work, but was an admirer of it. Berni wrote:

S'i' avessi l'ingegno del Burchiello,
Io vi farei volentieri un sonetto;
Ché non ebbi già mai tèma e subietto
Piú dolce, piú piacevol né piú bello.[61]

[If I had Burchiello's wit,
I would willingly write you a sonnet;
For never did I have a theme and subject
More sweet, more pleasant, more beautiful.] 

According to the Princeton Encyclopedia of Poetry, the form is most frequently used for satire, such as the most prominent English instance, John Milton's "On the New Forcers of Conscience Under the Long Parliament."

Gerard Manley Hopkins used the form in a less satirical mood in his "That Nature is a Heraclitean Fire." The poem is one of many in which Hopkins experimented with variations on sonnet form.  However, unlike the curtal sonnet, a Hopkins invention which is a 10½-line form with precisely the same proportions as a Petrarchan sonnet, his caudate sonnet is a full sonnet unmodified but with an extra six lines.  Hopkins heightens the effect of the extension with an enjambment from the 14th line to the 15th.

Hopkins explored the possibility of such a coda in a series of letters exchanged with Robert Bridges, from whom he learned of the centrality of Milton's example in the form.  Though the intent of his example is distinct from Milton's satirical use, the effect of the coda—to add stability to the poem's close—is comparable.

References

External links
Text of Milton's "On the New Forces of Conscience"

Sonnet studies

ja:ソネット#コーデイト・ソネット